Death Is Glory... Now is a compilation release by Reverend Bizarre. It was released on 2xCD in 2009 by Spikefarm Records. The first disc contains songs only found on rare Reverend Bizarre split albums, while the second contains a collection of various hard-to-find covers Reverend Bizarre released over the years.

Track listing

Disc 1

Disc 2

Note
"From the Void II" is not a cover, but was likely put on Disc 2 due to insufficient space on Disc 1. Similarly, Disc 2 omits Reverend Bizarre's Barathrum and Burzum covers. However, these are available on the widely circulated Return to the Rectory and Harbinger of Metal EPs, respectively, and hence are not difficult to find.

Reverend Bizarre albums
2009 compilation albums